Archon is a genus of Palaearctic swallowtail butterflies in the subfamily Parnassiinae. Traditionally, only two species have been known: Archon apollinus and Archon apollinaris. Recent studies, however, have given specific status to a third taxon, Archon bostanchii.

Taxonomy 
The genus consists of the following species:

Food plants 
Species from this genus feed on Aristolochia species.

Notes

References
 Carbonell, F., 1991. Contribution à la connaissance du genre Archon Hübner 1822: Découverte de zones de sympatrie pour Archon apollinus (Herbst) et Archon apollinaris Staudinger (Lepidoptera: Papilionidae). Linneana Belgica 13: 3-12.
 Carbonell, F. and Michel, M., 2007. Une espèce jumelle méconnue du genre Archon Hübner, 1822 (Lepidoptera, Papilionidae). Bulletin de la Société entomologique de France 112 (2), 2007 : 141-150.
Nazari, V. and Sperling, F.A.H., 2007. Mitochondrial DNA divergence and phylogeography in western Palaearctic Parnassiinae (Lepidoptera: Papilionidae): How many species are there? Insect Systematics & Evolution 38: 121-138. pdf

External links
Tree of Life

Papilionidae
Butterfly genera
Taxa named by Jacob Hübner